BIT Zone Station (Hangul: 지식정보단지) is a subway station on Line 1 of the Incheon Subway in Yeonsu-gu, Incheon, South Korea. The station has three entrances, a small community stage, and a large sky-lit atrium inside the fare area.

The name "Bio-Information Technology Zone" refers to Songdo planners' efforts to promote scientific entrepreneurship in the area. The station is one of few in the Seoul metro system to have a different English name from the Korean one.

Station layout

Galerry

References 

Metro stations in Incheon
Seoul Metropolitan Subway stations
Railway stations opened in 2009
Yeonsu District